Karlovo is a historically important town in central Bulgaria located in a fertile valley along the river Stryama at the southern foot of the Balkan Mountains. It is administratively part of Plovdiv Province and has a population of about 300,340, the mayor being Dr. Emil Kabaivanov.

Karlovo is famous for the worldwide-known rose oil, which is grown there and used in producing perfume. In addition to this, Karlovo is the birthplace of Vasil Levski, the most distinguished Bulgarian to start preparing the national liberation from the Ottoman rule in the late 19th century. There is a museum and large monument dedicated to him. Karlovo is also a popular location for tourism in the region.

During the 2000s, Bulgarian archaeologists made discoveries in Central Bulgaria which were summarized as 'The Valley of the Thracian Kings'. On 19 August 2005, some archaeologists announced they had found the first Thracian capital, which was situated near Karlovo in Bulgaria. Many polished ceramic artifacts (pieces of roof-tiles and Greek-like vases) were discovered revealing the fortune of the town. The Bulgarian Ministry of Culture declared its support to the excavations.

History

Karlovo is a successor of the medieval fortress of Kopsis (Копсис in Bulgarian, Kωψίς or Κόψη in Byzantine Greek), a feudal possession of Smilets of Bulgaria in the 13th-14th century and the likely capital of his brother despotēs Voysil's short-lived realm.

The region became part of the Ottoman Empire in the late 14th century. The modern town originated in 1483 at the place of the village of Sushitsa (still today Sushitsa is one of Karlovo's districts) during the reign of Sultan Bayezit II, and was originally named Karlıova (Karlı's Plain) after its founder Karlızade Lala Ali Bey. The Kurshum Mosque (Leaden Mosque), built in 1485, is the oldest surviving building in the town, although today it is not in use.

There was once a longstanding dispute on town limits between Karlıova and nearby Sopot. Matters came to a head in 1633, when Sultan Murad IV had to personally issue a firman (imperial decree) and dispatched officials from Eski Zağra (Stara Zagora) and Istanbul to determine the borders between the two towns. The territorial dispute was decided in favour of Karlıova.

The town grew in importance in the 19th century as a centre of Bulgarian culture and revolutionary activity. In 1869 the first chitalishte was opened. In 1876 Lady Strangford arrived from Britain with relief for the people of Bulgaria following the massacres that followed the April Uprising. She built a hospital at Batak and eventually other hospitals were built at Radilovo, Panagiurishte, Perushtitsa, Petrich and here at Karlovo. After five centuries of Turkish rule, Karlıova was incorporated into the newly-established Principality of Bulgaria in 1878 and renamed Karlovo.

From 1953 until 1962, the town was called Levskigrad.

Geography
It is located in the Valley of Roses, known for the big-scale production of roses. Stara Planina mountain lies above the town. The highest peak of this mountain range — Botev, 2376m — is close to Karlovo.

Climate
The climate of the region is temperate continental, with mild and warm summers, refreshed by the wind coming down the Balkan Mountain, and snowy winters.

Infrastructure and transport
Karlovo is located on the main road E 78, one of the two roads which connect the capital Sofia to the southern part of the Black Sea.
The town is an important point on the railway between Sofia and the commercially important Black Sea port of Burgas. There are frequent trains to the second biggest railway station in the country — Plovdiv.

Municipality

Karlovo is the seat of Karlovo municipality (part of Plovdiv Province). The population of the Karlovo municipality  is approximately 73,000 people. It includes the following 27 towns and villages (towns in bold):

Notable people
 Evlogi Georgiev (1819–1897), merchant, banker and entrepreneur
 Ivan Bogorov (c. 1820–1892), encyclopedist
 Vasil Levski (1837–1873), revolutionary and national hero of Bulgaria
 Hristo Prodanov (1943–1984), first Bulgarian to climb Mount Everest without oxygen mask.
 Nelly Petkova (b. 1983), pop and folklore singer

Notable events
 The Day of the Rose in the first days of June
 Anniversary of Vasil Levski's death
 Anniversary of Vasil Levski's birth - each year on the evening of the 18th of July, one can enjoy a huge firework show in the revolutionary hero's honor.

Attractions

Landmarks
 Suchurum Waterfall. The  Suchurum (flying water) waterfall is also known as the Karlovo waterfall.
It is located right below the Karlovo water-power station, on the left tributary of Stryama River - Stara Reka, taking its sources from the two tributaries – the Malkata Reka springing South of the peaks of Ambaritsa and Malak Kupen and Golyamata River – springing South below the peak of Zhultets.
 'Central Balkan' National Park. The 'Central Balkan' National Park is situated in the heart of Bulgaria, in the central and highest parts of the Balkan Mountain. The highest peak in the Park is Botev peak (2376). The park occupies a total area of 72 021 ha and includes parts of the territories of 5 administrative areas – Lovech, Gabrovo, Stara Zagora, Plovdiv and Sofia. The Park includes 9 natural reserves – 'Boatin', 'Tsarichina', 'Kozya Stena', 'Steneto', 'Severen Dzhendem', 'Peeshti Skali', 'Sokolna', 'Dzhendema' and 'Stara Reka'. The reserves occupy an area of 20,019.6 ha. Eight of them (excluding 'Kozya Stena') and 'Central Balkan' Park are included in the UN list of national parks and other protected territories. Boatin, Tsarichina, Dzhendema and Steneto are a part of the network of biosphere reserves. In 2003 the 'Central Balkan' National Park became a member of PAN Parks, which is an international appraisal of its well preserved and managed wild nature. In 2004 a holder of the PAN Parks certificate is also the park region.

Museums

 'Vasil Levski' National Museum. The 'Vasil Levski' National Museum is dedicated to Vasil Levski and covers his house, exhibition hall, Memorial Chapel 'Halloween Bolgarskii' and Chardaklievata house. For several decades it has collected and stored belongings, documents and photos relating to family life and work of Vasil Levski, its associates and from Karlovo and other parts of the country. It Keeps almost all scientific research and biographical literature devoted to Levski works of art. In 2000, the museum complex was built and designed by architect Mary Karazlateva Memorial Chapel 'Halloween Bolgarskii' in honour of the Apostle. It keeps part of his hair. National Museum 'Vasil Levski' is part of the 100 Tourist Sites of Bulgaria by the Bulgarian Tourist Union.Open year-round. Summer Hours: 8:30 - 13:00 and 14:00 to 17:30; Winter hours: 08:00 to 13:00 and 14:00 to 17:00.

Municipal Historical Museum - Karlovo. The museum exposition is settled in the building of the ancient Bulgarian school, a significant architectural and historical monument of culture (1871). Two are the main expositions: 'Ethnography' and 'Bulgarian National Revival'. Special attention is to be paid to the Ethnographic department, where art jewelers, tissues and tools of ancient crafts are collected and exposed. A huge number of documents and belongings of the economic, cultural and social life in the town of Karlovo are exposed in 'The Bulgarian Revival' department. Part of the museum is also the ethnographic collection in the Mazakova house built around 1848. It is located in the Old Town of Karlovo and is an architectural and historical cultural monument. A permanent ethnographic exhibition is arranged in it, presenting original fabrics, traditional costumes of Karlovo, domestic crafts and more.

The museum is open year-round working hours: 08:00 to 12:00 and 13:00 to 17:00 pm.
 Architectural and Historical Reserve 'The Old Town'. It has preserved the spirit of the Bulgarian National Revival despite the modern architectural style. This part of the town has preserved about 115 houses, monuments of culture. The old houses of Karlovo have high architectural value with their woodcarved ceilings, the yards with decorative doors and marvelous Murals on the stonewalls, the silent cobbled yards and shady vines, box shrub and flower gardens.
 The Bouhalov Han (Inn). The inn was once used to host the Bulgarian Revolutionary Central Committee founded by Vassil Levski; as well as the meetings of the Karlovo 'Friends of Learning' group. The first 'Abstention from Drinking' Association was also founded in the inn. Later on, until the end of the 1950s, the town’s Community Centre and the Library had been hosted in that building. According to the will of Kirko Bouhalov’s daughter, Penka Popova, the building was donated to the town in 1937. During the 1970s, the building was transformed into a students’ hostel but, due to its poor condition, the town authorities closed it. For 20 years the Bouhalov Han (Inn) had been staying lifeless and slowly turning to ruins, thus taking away part of the Revival Period history of that town. The building is now a Handicrafts’ Centre, since Karlovo has preserved alive even today the traditional handicrafts, such as: Goldsmith’s and Coppersmith’s trade, carpet industry, Pottery, woolen braiding manufacturing, Wood carving, cooperage, Engraving, icon-painting (Iconography), Kalofer lace and many others.

Other
The Vasil Levski Monument. The impressive monument of Vasil Levski was built in 1903 - 1907 by Marin Vasilev and is situated in the centre of the Old town of Karlovo, near the St. Nikola church. The sculptor has depicted the Apostle of freedom Vasil Levski in full length, with a revolver in his hand. Next to him stands the roaring lion (i.e. the people). The low relief on both sides of the monument is covered with the names of the people from Karlovo who died for the Liberation of Bulgaria.

Culture

Education
The library counts about 68,000 library documents and books.

Religion

Orthodox Church Saint Nikolas was built in 1847 by Nikola Troyanov.

Notable people
 Avram Dimitrievich (17th century), priest, first teacher, skilled writer and calligrapher
 Anka Lambreva (1895 - 1976), traveler
 Anna Laleva Zaimova (Atanasova) (1894 - 1983), wife of Gen. Vladimir Zaimov
 Botyo Petkov (1815 - 1869), Revival teacher and father of Hristo Botev
 Braiko H. Genov (1814 - 1865), teacher, priest, collector of folk vocabulary - riddles, proverbs
 Vasil Karaivanov (1847 - 1933), cousin and supporter of Levski
 Vasil Kirkov (1870 - 1931), dramatic artist, one of the founders of the Bulgarian National Theater
 Vasil Levski (1837 - 1873), revolutionary and national hero
 Ivan Nochev (1916 - 1991), participated in the invention of the engines of the module (reached the moon) "Eagle" of "Apollo-11"
 Evlogi Georgiev (1819 - 1897), entrepreneur, industrialist, philanthropist
 Elena Snezhina (1882 - 1944), the first Bulgarian dramatic actress
 Ivan Bogorov (1818 - 1892), Bulgarian educator, publicist, journalist and encyclopedist, guardian of the purity of the Bulgarian language.
 Ivan Lazarov (1890 - 1952), sculptor
  (1865 - 1966), founder of the Bulgarian theater and its historian
 Kostadin Georgiev, a revolutionary from the IMRO, a Chetnik of Stefan Dimitrov
 Stoycho Kerev (1965), journalist, producer and media expert, "Question of Perspective" and "New Knowledge", author, lecturer and communicator of methods for behavior and analysis
 Raina Kasabova (1897 - 1969), participated in the first combat flight in the world, throwing summons over Edirne
 Lazar Lazarov (1864 -?), Bulgarian officer, lieutenant general
 Lazar Nenkov Lazarov (1941 - 2006), artist
 Maria Simova (1920 - 1977), dramatic artist and playwright
 Mikhail Ganchev (1872 - 1931), Bulgarian military and revolutionary
 Nikolay Stoyanov (1948), Bulgarian writer and translator
 Paisii Karavelov (1891 - 1944), Bulgarian clergyman and public figure
 Pencho Radov, Bulgarian Revival book publisher and bookseller
 Petko Abadjiev (born 1913), artist
 Petar Alexandrov (born 1962), footballer, national, bronze medalist at the 1994 World Cup in the United States.
 Peter Tantilov (1861 - 1937), military figure, lieutenant general
 Peter Yurukov (1882 - 1905), revolutionary
 Hadji Todor Sahatchiev (unknown - 1877), Revival educator, merchant
 Rayno Popovich (1773 - 1858), a teacher and writer from Kotel, called the "teacher of teachers"
 Rangel Gerovski (1959 - 2004), Bulgarian wrestler, Olympic medalist
 Stefan Nikolov, revolutionary from VMORO, Chetnik of Stefan Dimitrov
 Stefan x. Ivanov, Bulgarian revolutionary from VMORO, Chetnik of Kocho Tsonkov
 Hristo Georgiev (1824 - 1872), entrepreneur
 Hristo Mutafchiev (born 1969), actor
 Hristo Prodanov (1943 - 1984), climber, climbed Everest
 Hristo Stoyanov, Bulgarian revolutionary from VMORO, Chetnik of Tane Nikolov
 Hristo Dzhapunov (1850 - 1908), who constructed a machine for shoe sticks, became an attraction at the first Bulgarian exhibition in Plovdiv in 1892.
 Vasil Banov, July 26, 1946, actor

Honour
Karlovo Peak on Livingston Island in the South Shetland Islands, Antarctica is named after Karlovo.

Town twinning

 Bryansk, Bryansk Oblast, Russia
 Osio Sotto, Italy
 Konin, Poland
 Baranovichi, Belarus
 Seeheim-Jugenheim, Germany, since 2018

References

 Aleksandar Zlatanov. Karlovo's Bazaar (Charshiya) During The Bulgarian National Revival -In: Standards of Everyday in the Middle Ages and in Modern Times, Vol. 3. Veliko Tarnovo, 2014, pp. 506-513
 
 Karlovo - 'Vasil Levski' Museum (in Bulgarian)
 Karlovo information from Bulgarian Tourism
 Karlovo information from visitcentralbalkan.net

External links

 Official web site
 Info site about the region of Karlovo (in Bulgarian and English)
 All about Karlovo
 Startsi-Kukeri-Mummers of Karlovo Region, Bulgaria
 Actual information about Karlovo and the region

 
Populated places in Plovdiv Province